Thalambadi is a village panchayat in Namakkal in the state of Tamil Nadu, India.

Located 11 km from the city of Namakkal and 2 km from National Highway (NH-7). It had a population of approximately 2,700 at the 2001 census.  Amman Temple, Murugan Temple and Perumal temple are situated in the village

Nearest Bus Stop: Bommai kuttai medu (2 km)

Nearest railway station: KLGN/ Kalangani
Neighbour villages:
Thalambadi located north of periyagoundampatty, west of bommaikuttaimedu, east of sedapatty pudur, south of thipakapatty.
Bus availability:
Town bus : bus no 13(rasipuram to namakkal) bommaikuttaimedu bus stop
Thalambadi outer street:
Supreme avenue is located near thalambadi to periyagoundampatty road with capacity of more than 13 houses.

References

Villages in Namakkal district